KOKE-FM (99.3 MHz) is a commercial FM radio station broadcasting a progressive country radio format. Licensed to Thorndale, Texas, KOKE-FM serves the Greater Austin radio market. The station is owned by Genuine Austin Radio, LP.  The transmitter site is located on County Road 470 in Coupland, Texas.  The studios and offices are along Loop 360 in Southwest Austin.

KOKE-FM is also heard on an 80-watt translator station, K253AN at 98.5 MHz in Sunset Valley, Texas.

History

The Original 95.5 KOKE-FM
From a Texas Monthly cover story (April 2012):

"In the summer of 1972, Willie Nelson moved into Austin, just 6 months after KOKE-FM switched to its new format called Country Rock or the more politically correct term at the time "progressive country." Country Radio would never be the same. From the Carter Family to the Rolling Stones, to Waylon and Willie, you could hear the music that Austinites were listening to on I-35 and on South Congress. In 1974 Billboard named KOKE-FM the most innovative station in the country."

KOKE-FM played a role in the careers of all the "outlaws"..Waylon, Willie and the boys lead the way with KOKE-FM to help promote some of the most iconic singer/songwriters of the time thanks to program director Joe Gracey. When Jerry Jeff Walker needed an audience to record "Up Against the Wall Redneck Mother," he called KOKE-FM to get the crowd he needed.

One of the characteristics of a regional music business was that the players, operating out of the glare of the big media centers, often made their own rules. "Redneck Rock" was created by KOKE-FM where the "outlaws" played by their own rules.  No one realized that what had started in that little studio on North Lamar would have such a profound effect on country music all across the world.

Joe Garcia has been the vanguard and proprietor of the KOKE call letters at its home in Giddings, Texas at AM 1600. Joe’s Hall Of Fame broadcasting lineage includes his father, Jose (Jaime) Garcia, who blazed the trail and set the standard for Hispanic and Tejano broadcasting in Texas.

"Austin's on Track, 'Cause KOKE-FM is Back"
On June 28, 2012, KLGO moved "The Word" to KFON 1490 AM.  Subsequently, 99.3 changed call letters to KOKE-FM and began stunting with a live recording of Dale Watson's "Country My Ass" played in a continuous loop, calculated on-air as being played 1,694 times, the most times a radio station has looped a song as a stunt since 1995.  This example of stunting is notable for the station-specific nature of the song's lyrics.  Watson re-recorded the song for the occasion, adding a new coda in which he sings, "Now Austin's on track, 'cause KOKE-FM's back."

On July 8, 2012, the progressive country format pioneered in 1972 by the original KOKE-FM (now KKMJ-FM 95.5) was resurrected on 99.3 FM and K253AN (98.5 FM).

On April 19, 2014, translator K287FG (105.3 FM) dropped its simulcast of KOKE-FM and became "105.3 The Fringe", a freeform Triple-A station.

References

External links

OKE-FM
Radio stations established in 2002
2002 establishments in Texas